In text retrieval, full-text search refers to techniques for searching a single computer-stored document or a collection in a full-text database. Full-text search is distinguished from searches based on metadata or on parts of the original texts represented in databases (such as titles, abstracts, selected sections, or bibliographical references).

In a full-text search, a search engine examines all of the words in every stored document as it tries to match search criteria (for example, text specified by a user). Full-text-searching techniques became common in online bibliographic databases in the 1990s. Many websites and application programs (such as word processing software) provide full-text-search capabilities. Some web search engines, such as AltaVista, employ full-text-search techniques, while others index only a portion of the web pages examined by their indexing systems.

Indexing
When dealing with a small number of documents, it is possible for the full-text-search engine to directly scan the contents of the documents with each query, a strategy called "serial scanning". This is what some tools, such as grep, do when searching.

However, when the number of documents to search is potentially large, or the quantity of search queries to perform is substantial, the problem of full-text search is often divided into two tasks: indexing and searching. The indexing stage will scan the text of all the documents and build a list of search terms (often called an index, but more correctly named a concordance). In the search stage, when performing a specific query, only the index is referenced, rather than the text of the original documents.

The indexer will make an entry in the index for each term or word found in a document, and possibly note its relative position within the document. Usually the indexer will ignore stop words (such as "the" and "and") that are both common and insufficiently meaningful to be useful in searching. Some indexers also employ language-specific stemming on the words being indexed. For example, the words "drives", "drove", and "driven" will be recorded in the index under the single concept word "drive".

The precision vs. recall tradeoff

Recall measures the quantity of relevant results returned by a search, while precision is the measure of the quality of the results returned. Recall is the ratio of relevant results returned to all relevant results. Precision is the ratio of the number of relevant results returned to the total number of results returned.

The diagram at right represents a low-precision, low-recall search. In the diagram the red and green dots represent the total population of potential search results for a given search. Red dots represent irrelevant results, and green dots represent relevant results. Relevancy is indicated by the proximity of search results to the center of the inner circle. Of all possible results shown, those that were actually returned by the search are shown on a light-blue background. In the example only 1 relevant result of 3 possible relevant results was returned, so the recall is a very low ratio of 1/3, or 33%. The precision for the example is a very low 1/4, or 25%, since only 1 of the 4 results returned was relevant.

Due to the ambiguities of natural language, full-text-search systems typically includes options like stop words to increase precision and stemming to increase recall. Controlled-vocabulary searching also helps alleviate low-precision issues by tagging documents in such a way that ambiguities are eliminated. The trade-off between precision and recall is simple: an increase in precision can lower overall recall, while an increase in recall lowers precision.

False-positive problem

Full-text searching is likely to retrieve many documents that are not relevant to the intended search question. Such documents are called false positives (see Type I error). The retrieval of irrelevant documents is often caused by the inherent ambiguity of natural language. In the sample diagram at right, false positives are represented by the irrelevant results (red dots) that were returned by the search (on a light-blue background).

Clustering techniques based on Bayesian algorithms can help reduce false positives. For a search term of "bank", clustering can be used to categorize the document/data universe into "financial institution", "place to sit", "place to store" etc. Depending on the occurrences of words relevant to the categories, search terms or a search result can be placed in one or more of the categories. This technique is being extensively deployed in the e-discovery domain.

Performance improvements

The deficiencies of full text searching have been addressed in two ways: By providing users with tools that enable them to express their search questions more precisely, and by developing new search algorithms that improve retrieval precision.

Improved querying tools

Keywords. Document creators (or trained indexers) are asked to supply a list of words that describe the subject of the text, including synonyms of words that describe this subject. Keywords improve recall, particularly if the keyword list includes a search word that is not in the document text.
 Field-restricted search. Some search engines enable users to limit full text searches to a particular field within a stored data record, such as "Title" or "Author."
 . Searches that use Boolean operators (for example) can dramatically increase the precision of a full text search. The  operator says, in effect, "Do not retrieve any document unless it contains both of these terms." The  operator says, in effect, "Do not retrieve any document that contains this word." If the retrieval list retrieves too few documents, the  operator can be used to increase recall; consider, for example, . This search will retrieve documents about online encyclopedias that use the term "Internet" instead of "online." This increase in precision is very commonly counter-productive since it usually comes with a dramatic loss of recall.
 Phrase search. A phrase search matches only those documents that contain a specified phrase, such as 
 Concept search. A search that is based on multi-word concepts, for example Compound term processing. This type of search is becoming popular in many e-discovery solutions.
 Concordance search. A concordance search produces an alphabetical list of all principal words that occur in a text with their immediate context.
 Proximity search. A phrase search matches only those documents that contain two or more words that are separated by a specified number of words; a search for  would retrieve only those documents in which the words  occur within two words of each other.
 Regular expression. A regular expression employs a complex but powerful querying syntax that can be used to specify retrieval conditions with precision.
 Fuzzy search will search for document that match the given terms and some variation around them (using for instance edit distance to threshold the multiple variation)
 Wildcard search. A search that substitutes one or more characters in a search query for a wildcard character such as an asterisk. For example, using the asterisk in a search query  will find "sin", "son", "sun", etc. in a text.

Improved search algorithms
The PageRank algorithm developed by Google gives more prominence to documents to which other Web pages have linked. See Search engine for additional examples.

Software

The following is a partial list of available software products whose predominant purpose is to perform full-text indexing and searching. Some of these are accompanied with detailed descriptions of their theory of operation or internal algorithms, which can provide additional insight into how full-text search may be accomplished.

Free and open source software 

 Apache Lucene
 Apache Solr
 ArangoSearch
 BaseX
 KinoSearch
 Lemur/Indri
 mnoGoSearch
 OpenSearch
 PostgreSQL
 Searchdaimon
 Sphinx
 Swish-e
 Terrier IR Platform
 Xapian

Proprietary software 

 Algolia
 Autonomy Corporation
 Azure Search
 Bar Ilan Responsa Project
 Basis database
 Brainware
 BRS/Search 
 Concept Searching Limited
 Dieselpoint
 dtSearch
 Elasticsearch
 Endeca
 Exalead
 Fast Search & Transfer
 Inktomi
 Lucid Imagination
 MarkLogic
 SAP HANA
 Swiftype
 Thunderstone Software LLC.
 Vespa
 Vivísimo

References

See also
Pattern matching and string matching
Compound term processing
Enterprise search
Information extraction
Information retrieval
Faceted search
WebCrawler, first FTS engine
Search engine indexing - how search engines generate indices to support full-text searching

Text editor features
Information retrieval genres